HSH may refer to:

 Hekurudha Shqiptare, Albania's state-owned railway operator
 Henderson Executive Airport in Nevada, United States
 Hypomagnesemia with secondary hypocalcemia
 His or Her Serene Highness
 His Sultanic Highness
 H-S-H, an electric guitar pickup configuration
 Hudson Street Hooligans, a supporters group for Columbus Crew SC
 Hongkong and Shanghai Hotels, a holding company
 HSH Nordbank, a commercial bank in northern Europe
 Hochschule Hannover, a university in Germany
 Homebush railway station, in Sydney, Australia
 Hungarian Sign Language
 Hydrogenated starch hydrosylate, an artificial sugar substitute